Independence Day shooting (United States) may refer to:

 1999 Independence Day weekend shootings, a three-day shooting spree in Illinois and Indiana
 Highland Park parade shooting, which occurred at an Independence Day parade in 2022